Ethel's Romeos is a 1915 American short comedy film featuring Oliver Hardy.

Cast
 Fayette Perry as Ethel
 Bud Ross as Charlie
 Edward Boulden as Albert 
 Herbert Stanley as Frank
 Madge Orlamond as Miss Stimpson
 Oliver Hardy as Jake Stimpson (as Babe Hardy)

See also
 List of American films of 1915
 Oliver Hardy filmography

References

External links

1915 films
1915 comedy films
1915 short films
American silent short films
American black-and-white films
Silent American comedy films
American comedy short films
Films directed by Edwin Middleton
1910s American films